Sangju is a city in North Gyeongsang Province, central South Korea. Although Sangju is rather rural, it is very old and was once a key city. Along with Gyeongju, it gives rise to half of the name of the Gyeongsang provinces. Sangju is nicknamed Sam Baek, or "Three Whites", referring to three prominent agricultural products rice, silkworm cocoons, and dried persimmons from the area.

Geography and climate

Geography

Sangju lies on the northwestern border of North Gyeongsang province, touching on North Chungcheong province. Thus, to its west and north it adjoins the North Chungcheong counties of Boeun, Goesan, Okcheon, and Yeongdong. Within North Gyeongsang province, it touches Mungyeong on the north, Yecheon, Uiseong, and Gumi on the east, and Gimcheon to the south.

The north and west extremes of the city are found in Hwabuk-myeon, at 127°47′55″E and 36°14′6″N, respectively. The southern limit lies in Gongseong-myeon at 36°14′06″N, on the border with Gimcheon city.

All of Sangju lies in the valley  of the Nakdong River. Various tributaries flow into the Nakdong in Sangju, including the Yeong (which rises in Mungyeong). The land slopes down from the Sobaek Mountains in the east to the river basin. The highest elevation in Sangju is found at the top of Songnisan, 1,058 m above sea level. Like most of South Korea, the terrain is generally hilly, with only a few flat areas along the rivers.  Because of this rugged terrain, 67% of the land in Sangju is classified as "vacant," unused for agricultural or other purposes.

Namsan mountain is located in the city.

Climate
Sangju has a humid continental climate (Köppen: Dwa), but can be considered a borderline humid subtropical climate (Köppen: Cwa) using the  isotherm. The temperature in the mountainous northwest is normally substantially lower. The mean annual rainfall is

History

Sangju has played an important role in much of Korean history. It first emerges after the Silla conquest of the area, in which minor states such as Goryeong Gaya (in Hamchang-eup) and Sabeol-guk (in Sabeol-myeon) were subjugated. The dates at which these conquests occurred are open to dispute, but it is apparent that the area was under firm Silla control by 505, and probably for some time before then.

Under Silla, the fortress of Sangju was one of the nine ju, or provincial administrative units, into which the portions of the kingdom near Gyeongju were divided. It played a critical role in regulating traffic along the east–west transit route which connected the Han River valley in the west (which Silla acquired in 553) with Gyeongju area. It would have been the first major city that Buddhist missionaries from Goguryeo would have reached when travelling down from Haneuljae Pass in the 6th century.

During the tumultuous decline of Unified Silla in the late 9th century, a number of rebellions occurred in Sangju, as they did throughout the country. Notable among them are the rebellions of Ajagae, who seized the fortress of Sangju and declared himself a general, and the Silla noble Bak Eon-chang, who re-established the kingdom of Sabeol-guk in the Sabeol-myeon area until he was overthrown by the Hubaekje leader Gyeon Hwon. Ajagae surrendered to Wanggeon in 918.

In 1895, as part of a general reorganization of local government, Sangju was designated Sangju-gun (Sangju County). In 1914, its boundaries were extended to cover Hamchang County, present-day Hamchang-eup. On January 1, 1986, separate administrative divisions were created for the city center (which was called Sangju City) and the outskirts (which continued to be called Sangju County). On January 1, 1995, the city and county were reunified to create the present-day entity of Sangju City.

Under Japanese occupation, the occupation government made various efforts to modernize local agriculture and resource extraction. The railroad through Sangju was completed in 1924, and around the same time the agricultural-training institution which would become Sangju National University was established.

Government

The legislative and executive branches of Sangju City are headed by officials elected by popular vote. This has been the case across South Korea since 1991, when local representative government was resumed after a thirty-year suspension. Under current South Korean law, elections are held once every four years. The most recent elections were held in June 2002.

Executive
The mayor of Sangju is Jeong-beak Lee, of the [Saenuri, Party].

Legislative
The city council of Sangju is the chief legislative organ of the district. Like the mayor, the members of the city council are elected every four years. The chairman of the Sangju city council is Kim Ki-hwan (김기환). The council which began serving in 2002 is the fourth council to represent the present-day entity of Sangju City; the first was formed from the merger of the pre-existing councils of Sangju City and Sangju County. There are 23 members. One member is elected from each eup, myeon, and dong, except for Jinheung-dong and Dongseong-dong, which share a single representative.

Judicial
The regional court of Sangju oversees local courts in Mungyeong City and Yecheon County, in addition to Sangju. It reports to the provincial court in Daegu.

Economy

The economy of Sangju is traditionally agricultural. Agriculture remains an important sector, as 40% of the city's residents are engaged in farming. Sangju has the largest number of farming households of any district in South Korea, and the most agricultural land of any district in North Gyeongsang.

The area has been famed for sericulture (silk production) since Silla times. Currently  of land are engaged in silk production, bringing in about 434 million won annually. In addition, numerous other cash crops are farmed in the area. Other important products include grapes, apples, pears, and cucumbers.

Sangju today is an important regional center of industry and commerce as well, exerting a significant economic effect on neighboring areas. This is facilitated by its strong transit connections (see ''Transportation, below). Also, Sangju tries to keep up agaricultural section with some specialized produces such as dried persimmon and fruits raised in high altitude.

Divisions

Sangju is divided into one eup, seventeen myeon, and six dongs. These 24 primary divisions are made up of 361 ri.

The lone eup is Hamchang, on the city's northern border with Mungyeong.

From west to east along the city's northern border, the myeon are Hwabuk-myeon, Oeseo-myeon, Euncheok-myeon, and Ian-myeon which adjoins Hamchang-eup. From north to south along the western border are Sabeol-myeon, Jungdong-myeon, and Nakdong-myeon. From east to west along the southern border are Cheongni-myeon, Gongseong-myeon, Modong-myeon, and Moseo-myeon in the southwest corner. Along the central western border lie Hwadong-myeon and Hwanam-myeon. In addition, the interior of the city includes Hwaseo-myeon, Gonggeom-myeon, Naeseo-myeon and Oenam-myeon.

The dongs are clustered around the city center, and from 1986 to 1995 they made up all of Sangju City (see "History, above). They are Bukmun-dong in the northern part of town, Gyerim-dong in the northeast, Dongmun-dong to the east, Dongseong-dong to the southeast, Sinheung-dong to the south, and Namwon-dong to the west. Namwon-dong is the most populous, with 13,334 registered residents (2002).

Transportation

The Gyeongbuk Line railroad runs through Sangju city, connecting to the main Gyeongbu Line in Gimcheon. It is thus possible to take passenger trains from Sangju to major southeastern cities such as Daegu and Busan. The Gyeongbuk Line carries both passenger and freight traffic, and provides an important link for people and businesses in the hinterland of Sangju. Aside from Sangju Station itself, stations are located in Sabeol-myeon (Baegwon Station), Gonggeom-myeon (Yangjeom Station), and Hamchang-eup (Hamchang Station) north of the city, and Cheongni-myeon (Cheongni Station) and Gongseong-myeon (Oksan Station) to the south.

The Jungbu Naeryuk Expressway, number 45, runs from north to south through the city and connects Sangju with the national expressway grid. The Sangju interchange is located near the city center, and the North Sangju interchange near Hamchang. An additional expressway, number 30, which will run from west to east, is under construction.

In addition, national highways connect Sangju with many neighboring cities and towns. For example, National Road 3 has served as the traditional artery connecting Sangju with Mungyeong and Chungju, and National Road 25 continues to play an important role tying Sangju to its neighbor on the western side of the Sobaek mountains, Boeun County.

Education

Like the rest of South Korea, Sangju has a three-tiered system of education:  elementary, middle, and high. All public schools in the city are overseen by the Sangju Office of Education, which reports to the North Gyeongsang Provincial Office of Education. Most preschools (40 altogether) are also administered by the Office of Education, and are attached to elementary schools; however, five registered private preschools also operate in the city. In addition, the Sanghee School, which provides education for the mentally challenged from preschool to high school ages, is located in Namseong-dong in the city center.

There are 43 elementary schools in Sangju, including eleven branch schools. There are 17 public middle schools in the city, including two branch schools. Of these, one each is reserved exclusively for male and female students. In addition, there are five private middle schools, of which two are female-only, two male-only, and one coeducational. The city also boasts six private and six public high schools:  four of the private and two of the public institutions are gender-segregated. Half of the high schools offer technical training, and half maintain a general academic focus.

Sangju is home to Sangju National University, a government-administered institution with a focus on agricultural technology. Many young people of college age leave the area to attend schools in the Seoul National Capital Area or other major cities.

Twin towns – sister cities

Sangju is twinned with:

  Gochang County, North Jeolla (1999)
  Gangseo-gu, Seoul (2003)
  Davis, California, United States (2004)
  Yichun, Jiangxi, China (2005)
  Keelung, Taiwan (2013)

See also
List of cities in South Korea
Sangju Bicycle Museum
Tory Food
People Power Party (South Korea)

References

External links

 
Cities in North Gyeongsang Province